Benan Altıntaş (born 10 November 2001) is a Turkish women's football forward, who plays for  Turkcell Women's Football Super League club Ankara BB Fomget GS, and the Turkey women's national team.

Club career 
Altıntaş started her career entering the Ankara-based club Fomget Gençlik ve Spor in 2016. She played her first match in the 2016-17 Turkish Women's Third Football League on 13 November 2016. At the end of the season, she enjoyed her team's promotion the Second League. At the end of the 2018–19 season, her team became champion and was promoted to the Fşrst League.

International career 
Altıntaş was admitted to the Turkey girls' U-17 team, and debuted internationally at the UEFA Development Tournament against Russia on 12 May 2017. She participated at the 2018 UEFA Women's Under-17 Championship qualification - Group 7 matches. She capped in 12 matches and scored four goals in total for the Turkey U-17 team..

In 2018, she was called up to the Turkey U-19 team. She played in two friendly matches.

She became a member of the Turkey women's national team in the friendly match on 14 June 2021.

International goals

Social activity 
On 12 June 2021, the World Day Against Child Labour, Altıntaş joined with some of her teammates a social activity launched on the social media by the Turkish "World Academy of Local Government and Democracy" (WALD) in cooperation with the Turkish Football Federation.

Career statistics

Honours 
 Turkish Women's Second League
 Fomget Gençlik ve Spor
 Winners (1): 2018-19
 Third places (1): 2017-18
 Turkish Women's Third League
 Fomget Gençlik ve Spor
 Winners (1): 2016-17

References

External links 

2001 births
Living people
Turkish women's footballers
Women's association football forwards
Turkey women's international footballers
Turkish Women's Football Super League players
Fomget Gençlik ve Spor players
21st-century Turkish sportswomen